Irvin-Hamrick Log House is a historic home located near Boiling Springs, Cleveland County, North Carolina.  It consists of log and frame sections.  The front log section was built about 1795, and is a small, two room, rectangular, gable roof structure. It features a full-width shed porch.  The frame rear addition was built after the American Civil War and is under a gable roof set perpendicular to the log house.  Also on the property is a small cemetery enclosed by a wrought iron fence.

It was listed on the National Register of Historic Places in 1980.

References

Log houses in the United States
Houses on the National Register of Historic Places in North Carolina
Houses completed in 1795
Houses in Cleveland County, North Carolina
National Register of Historic Places in Cleveland County, North Carolina
Log buildings and structures on the National Register of Historic Places in North Carolina